Gilbert Komla Adanusa is a Ghanaian engineer and civil servant. He was president of the Ghana Institution of Engineering from 1988 to 1989, and the acting Director General of the Ghana Broadcasting Corporation from 1999 to 2000.

Adanusa served as Director of Engineering of External Communications at the Ghana Post and Telecommunications (now divided into Ghana Post and Vodafone Ghana) from 1984 to 1992. In 1998 he became a member of the International Institute of Communications. Prior to his appointment as acting Director General of the Ghana Broadcasting Corporation, he was an advisor to the Ministry of Transport and Communications, and a member of the Ghana Broadcasting Corporation board.

References

Ghanaian engineers
Ghanaian civil servants